Meandrusa is a genus of butterflies within the subfamily Papilioninae of the family Papilionidae (swallowtails).

Species 
Meandrusa gyas (Westwood, 1841) – brown gorgon
Meandrusa lachinus (Fruhstorfer, 1902)
Meandrusa payeni (Boisduval, 1836) – yellow gorgon
Meandrusa sciron (Leech, 1890) – Eastern brown gorgon

References

Papilionidae
Butterfly genera
Taxa named by Frederic Moore